XHBP-FM is a radio station on 90.3 FM in Gómez Palacio, Durango. The station is operated by GPS Media and known as Adictivo Radio.

History
XHBP began as XEBP-AM 1150, with a concession awarded in 1936 to Manuel Cano Maldonado but operated by Alejandro O. Stevenson Torrijos. It was the second station to come to air in the Comarca Lagunera, with a formal inauguration on August 31, 1939. The station broadcast on 1260 in the 1940s. By the 1950s, it was owned by La Voz de la Laguna, S.A. and had moved to 1450.

The station had been owned by Radio S.A. and Radiorama. Its transmitter remains at the Radiorama Laguna broadcast site in Gómez Palacio.

XEBP received authorization to move to FM as XHBP-FM 90.3 in 2011.

Until January 2015, XHBP carried the La Más Buena grupera format.

In 2019, Multimedios Radio took control of the entire Radio Centro Torreón cluster; Radio Recuerdo moved to XHWN-FM 93.9. XHBP then became known as "Stereo Vida" until it was leased out again, this time to new local group GPS Media, becoming Adictivo Radio in March 2020.

References

External links

Radio stations in Durango
Radio stations in the Comarca Lagunera
Multimedios Radio
1939 establishments in Mexico
Radio stations established in 1939